Kingdom Identity Ministries (KIM) is a self-described "outreach ministry" based in Harrison, Arkansas, which advocates racism, antisemitism, and extreme homophobia. Its website states that it "is an outreach ministry to God's chosen race" by which it means "the White, European peoples" whom it calls the "true Israel". It adheres to the white supremacist theology which is known as Christian Identity. The Southern Poverty Law Center considers it "the largest supplier in existence of materials related to Christian Identity".

It primarily functions as a distributor of books, tracts, and audiotapes about Christian identity and offers correspondence courses through its American Institute of Theology. KIM also produces the Herald of Truth radio program which is broadcast on shortwave, satellite, and Internet radio. In addition to Christian Identity material, KIM also circulates other white supremacist material. For example, it sends white supremacist pamphlets to rural communities in Pennsylvania and it funded the distribution of a white power music CD in 2007.

KIM was founded in 1982 by Mike Hallimore and it currently owns the copyright to a number of works on Christian Identity by Bertrand Comparet and Wesley Swift. Hallimore died on July 10, 2021, at his home in Alpena at age 74.

References

External links 
 

Christian Identity
Organizations that oppose LGBT rights in the United States
White supremacist groups in the United States
Antisemitism in the United States
Organizations based in Arkansas
Organizations established in 1982
Anti-black racism in the United States
1982 establishments in Arkansas
White American culture in Arkansas
Anti-communist organizations in the United States
Harrison, Arkansas